Tortilla Heaven is a 2005 independent comedy film written and directed by Judy Hecht Dumontet.

Premise
A tiny town in New Mexico is turned upside down when the image of Christ appears - burned onto a tortilla - in the community's only restaurant, "Tortilla Heaven."  Chaos ensues among the townfolk.

Cast

Reception

Critical response
The film was received mixed reviews from the press.  Film critic Brandon Fibbs wrote, "Inspired, incredibly, by a true story, Tortilla Heaven is a modern-day fable, a sort of biblical parable couched in comedy. While a fable is an amusing and compelling way to relate a story with a serious point, Tortilla Heaven at times undermines its message by stretching the comedy to its limits. An over-the-top courtroom battle and a child custody fight with a nudist hermit veer the film into the realm of the absurd far too often. Tortilla Heaven comes very close to becoming a parody of the true movie the filmmakers wanted to make. Tortilla Heaven is a low-budget, independent production, and, most of the time, it looks the part. For every bit of genuinely beautiful cinematography, there is another sloppy, amateur-hour moment."

Critic Justin Chang, critic for Variety, wrote, "Pic's almost exclusively Latino and Native American cast is mostly reduced to playing folksy caricatures, feverishly crossing themselves and peppering their Mexican-accented English with the odd exclamation in Spanish. But give some of the women credit: Olivia Hussey adds some loopy fun as a cow-milking nudist, while Lupe Ontiveros brings her usual brash attitude to bear on the role of a lecherous and overbearing mother-in-law. Production as a whole feels disjointed and thrown together for reasons that become all too clear in light of the film's 14 credited producers. Incidentally, the real-life "Holy Tortilla" legend hails from Lake Arthur, N.M., where the first (but certainly not the last) culinary manifestation of Jesus' face was reported in 1977. But after Tortilla Heaven, auds won't be praying for a Second Coming." On Rotten Tomatoes the film has a 25% approval rating from critics based on 12 reviews.

Awards
Nomination
 ALMA Award: American Latino Media Arts Award, Outstanding Performance of a Lead Latino/a Cast in a Motion Picture; 2006.

References

External links
 
 
 
 

2005 films
2005 comedy-drama films
Films set in Texas
Films shot in Austin, Texas
American comedy horror films
American comedy-drama films
Films scored by Christopher Lennertz
2000s English-language films
2000s American films